Teodorescu is a Romanian surname. Notable people with the surname include:

Constantin C. Teodorescu (1892-1972), engineer
Emanoil C. Teodorescu (1866-1949), botanist
Filip Teodorescu (1951-), diplomat
G. Dem. Teodorescu (1849-1900), folklorist and journalist
Ion Teodorescu (1976-), rugby union player
Margareta Teodorescu (1932-2013), chess player
Nicolae Teodorescu (1797-1880), church painter
Octave Octavian Teodorescu (1963), singer
Sebastian Teodorescu, mayor
Tudor Teodorescu-Braniște (1899-1969), journalist
Victor Teodorescu (1925-), pentathlete
Ted Dumitru (1939-2016), born Dumitru Teodorescu, football coach
Elena Leuşteanu (1935-2008), gymnast, sometimes known under the married name of Teodorescu
Sandu Tudor (1896-1962), born Alexandru Al. Teodorescu, poet and theologian

See also
65001 Teodorescu, a main-belt asteroid
Theodorescu

Romanian-language surnames
Patronymic surnames
Surnames from given names